Dissotrocha is a genus of rotifers belonging to the family Philodinidae. The species of this genus are found in Europe, Australia and North America.

Species
The following species are recognised in the genus Dissotrocha:

Dissotrocha aculeata 
Dissotrocha bjoerki 
Dissotrocha decembullata 
Dissotrocha guyanensis 
Dissotrocha hertzogi 
Dissotrocha kostei 
Dissotrocha macrostyla 
Dissotrocha pectinata 
Dissotrocha schlienzi 
Dissotrocha scutellata 
Dissotrocha spinosa

References

Bdelloidea
Rotifer genera